White Town is a ghost town in Rushcreek Township, Logan County, Ohio. It was located in Rushcreek Township.

History
White Town was laid out in 1832 by William White, and named for him.

References

Geography of Logan County, Ohio
Ghost towns in Ohio
1832 establishments in Ohio
Populated places established in 1832